Aspidosperma australe  is a timber tree native to Brazil, Argentina, Bolivia, and Paraguay.

References

australe
Trees of Brazil
Plants described in 1860